The Democratic Republic of the Congo observes UTC+01:00 (West Africa Time) and UTC+02:00 (Central Africa Time). It does not observe DST. It is the only country in Africa to use more than one time zone.

IANA time zone database
The IANA time zone database contains two zone for the country. The columns marked * contain the data from the file zone.tab of the database.

References